Extended Play is New Zealand singer Gin Wigmore's debut extended play release.

Track listing

Charts

Certifications

References

2008 debut EPs
Gin Wigmore albums